Heidi Lindström (born 30 November 1981) is a retired Finnish footballer. Lindstrom spend most of her career at HJK. During Lindstrom's career she won 6 Kansallinen Liiga titles. Since retiring Lindstrom became a youth coach for HJK. She also took up playing handball for Sparta.

International career

Lindström was part of the Finnish team at the 2005 European Championships.

References

1981 births
Living people
Helsingin Jalkapalloklubi (women) players
Finnish women's footballers
FC Honka (women) players
Kansallinen Liiga players
Finnish female handball players
Finland women's international footballers
Women's association football midfielders